is a Japanese dōjinshi manga series written and illustrated by Yukiusa about a black cat who becomes a vampire after being abandoned. An anime television series by Gonzo was broadcast in Japan between July 6, 2011, and September 19, 2011.

Plot 
A small abandoned kitten is rescued by a vampire, who feeds him some of his blood, allowing him to be reborn as a vampire cat named Nyanpire. The series follows Nyanpire's every day life such as spending time with Misaki, his human owner and meeting other cats. Nyanpire also meets two bats called Mori and Komori.

Characters 

A small black cat who was reborn as a vampire and lives with a human owner called Misaki. As a vampire, he loves blood, but also enjoys similarly red foods, such as tomato ketchup and blood orange juice.

A samurai cat who falls in love with Nyanpire.

A white angel cat who was kicked out of heaven for his womanizing behavior.

A siamese cat who wears a large ribbon. He lives with Misaki alongside Nyanpire.
 

A pair of bats who are somewhat related to the vampire who gave life to Nyanpire.

Nyanpire's human owner.

Media

Anime 
In January 2011, the Japanese animation studio Gonzo announced that an anime television adaptation of the manga was under production. Directed by Takahiro Yoshimatsu and written by Natsuko Takahashi, the series aired in Japan between July 6, 2011, and September 19, 2011.

See also 
 Vampire films
 List of vampire television series

References

External links 
 Nyanpire Blog 
 Nyanpire: The Animation Official Website  
 

2011 Japanese television series debuts
Gonzo (company)
Vampires in animated television
Vampires in anime and manga
Animated television series about cats
Doujinshi